Henricus powelli is a species of moth of the family Tortricidae. It is found in Mexico in the states of Tamaulipas, Nuevo León and Veracruz.

References

Moths described in 1984
Henricus (moth)